¿Con qué sueñas? (English: What is your Dream?)  is a Chilean television series created by Paula Gómez Vera. Both his first and second season counted on 16 episodes of 30 minutes each. The show was broadcast on TVN, and received a number of awards, including two Emmys in 2011 and 2015.

Awards

References

External links 
 Official website

Chilean children's television series
2010s Chilean television series